Cleft Peak is a mountain in South West Tasmania.  It lies on the North West end of the Frankland Range jutting out toward the East from the range toward the impoundment Lake Pedder.  It is South East of Murpheys Bluff and North West of Greycap.

See also
Lake Pedder
Strathgordon, Tasmania
South West Wilderness, Tasmania

References
 Solitary 4224, Edition 1 2001, Tasmania 1:25000 Series, Tasmap

Mountains of Tasmania
South West Tasmania